Bebaak is a Pakistani drama television series produced by Moomal Shuanid under banner Moomal Entertainment. It features Yashma Gill in the lead role alongside Srha Asghar, Ali Ansari, Adnan Jaffar, Raeed Muhammad Alam and Faiq Khan in prominent roles. The series premiered on 8 December 2021 replacing Sila-e-Mohabbat. Bebaak revolves around Wafa, a poor university student who aspires to be rich and successful at any cost.

Plot 

Wafa gets a scholarship to the top university in the city and pretends to be rich by unethical means. Her father is a gambler, while her mother is a teacher who tries to make ends meet, but she dreams to be rich and does not care about her mother's struggle. She traps a guy Meesam meanwhile Meesam's family wants him to get married to his friend Shiza meesam doesn’t agree and insists on getting married to Wafa. Shiza is heartbroken and decides to leave the country. Wafa is engaged to her cousin Farhad. She treats him like a slave. She tells Farhad to break their engagement so that she can marry Meesam. Farhad agreed. Soon after Wafa gets engaged to meesam. Wafa lies to meesam that Farhad is just her driver. Farhad drops Wafa to college daily in his boss's car. One day Farhad says that he cannot pick up Wafa from college as he is busy with work. Wafa goes home in a rickshaw. Shiza saw her going home and decides to follow her she saw that Wafa lives in a small house. She asked Wafas neighbors about her family and finds out the truth. She tries to tell meesam the truth about Wafa. At first, meesam doesn’t believe her but then Shiza took him to Wafa's house. Meesam is shocked to see that Wafa was just after his money. The next day he went to college and in front of everybody he insults Wafa and tells them the truth about her and that she is a liar. Soon after Wafa returns again with a new identity as Sahar she looks for a job to trap someone there when she is going she gets purposely falls on someone’s car the person thinks that he accidentally hit Wafa. He apologizes and Wafa insults him. Wafa goes for a job interview when she sees who the boss is she is shocked to see that it was the same guy who she insulted after he hit her. The boss selected her and she gets a job she later finds out that the boss is meesam brother Asad she now wants to marry Asad to take revenge on Meesam. She gets an invitation to meesam and shiza wedding and she decides to go. Asad has a wife: Sunaina and a daughter: Laiba. When Wafa goes to Meesam's wedding she secretly goes into Meesam's room when meesam sees her face he is shocked to find out that it’s Wafa. Meesam says to her to get out of his room but Wafa locks the door saying that she wants to talk to meesam meanwhile everyone is waiting for Meesam. They knock on the door telling him to come out meesam says that he is locked everyone at home panics Meesam's mother tells Asad to bring a spare key to open the door meesam tells wafa to hide. Wafa says she will if Meesam promises to meet her tomorrow. Meesam agreed. Meesam then marries Shiza. Shiza asked meesam if there was anyone in the room at that time meesam denied it and say that there was no one there meesam goes to meet wafa at a restaurant wafa tells him that she never forgets Meesam and ask him to be friends with her to which Meesam says no and says that he doesn’t want to even see her Meesam returns back to home. Shiza gets suspicious of meesam and asks him if he went to see Wafa. Meesam again denies Wafa keeps calling Meesam at night Shiza saw Meesam talking to Wafa and confronts him. Meesam tells her the truth Shiza goes to the restaurant and confronts Wafa and tells her to never call Meesam again now Wafa wants to trap Meesam's brother Asad. She pretends to be a very innocent and very straightforward nice girl Asad likes Sahar aka Wafa's character one day, Wafa pretends to get sick and Asad comes to her home where she lives with her friend Shazia. Asad asks Wafa to marry him. Wafa agrees and they get married the following week. Meanwhile, at Wafa's house, her brother dies of cancer, and Wafa went to visit there as she left her home a long time ago when she ran away from Farhad's house. Wafas sister tell her to stop trapping people but She doesn’t understand meanwhile Assad’s family is very worried as he did not came home from a few days . Asad comes back home his wife sunaina. 
And his mother asked him where he was to which he replied that he had a meeting in Dubai his behaviour with sunaina become worse day by day one day Asad had a road accident after the accident he tells his family about his second wife sehar his family is heartbroken to hear that but still accepts her for Assad’s sake but soon they found out that it was wafa they are shocked wafa keeps telling lies to Asad and makes him believe that sunaina is bad meanwhile she also blackmails Assad’s daughter laiba 
As she made a video of her with a boy at hospital talking she tells her that she needs to Do what she says if she doesn’t want to get expose . Meanwhile at wafas house her father marries her sister to his friend who is also a gambler . Farhad helps her to escape from her house and takes her to wafa wafa promise that she will keep her sister at her friend Shazia house but wafa called her fathers friend to come and get her for eight lakh . After wafas father founds out that his daughter ran away he divorces wafas mother . Wafas mother in search of job ends up at Assad’s house one day wafa blackmails laiba to poison shiza when laiba is putting poison in shiza sweets wafas mother sees her and tell her to stop and don’t get scared by wafa she then throw that sweet . Wafa then got angry with laiba and send her videos to meesam and tell him to give her the house or else she will viral it then meesam tells sunaina about wafas act sunaina scold laiba laiba in stress gets into an accident everyone is at the hospital and they discover that she needs o positive blood which only wafa has so then they give wafa house documents in return of her blood then one day Assad’s returns from his work and heated wafa talking on the phone with her friend he confronts wafa and wafa throws him downstairs in the hospital wafa with the help of police gets in Assad’s room and take his oxygen mask off asad dies then wafa traps shiza father in marrying her shiza father was about to marry wafa but shiza was against it then meesam says wafa that he will marry her but then he traps her into getting the house documents again and wafa gets a taste of her own medicine then wafa find out that she has brain tumour and she realised her mistake and apologised everyone at meesams house meesam names his son asad. Wafa does soon after and his father ends up homeless.

Cast 
 Yashma Gill as Wafa
 Srha Asghar as Shiza
 Ali Ansari as Mesum
 Raeed Muhammad Alam as Farhad
 Adnan Jaffar as Waqar: Shiza’s father
 Faiq Khan as Asad
 Laila Wasti as Nafisa
 Farah Nadeem as Samina
 Adnan Shah Tipu as Wafa's father
 Amna Malik as Sunaina
 Ismat Zaidi

Reception 
In early February 2022, it received television ratings of 4-5 TRPs.

References 

2020s drama television series
2021 Pakistani television series debuts
2022 Pakistani television series endings